Alena Potůčková (19 March 1953 in Roudnice nad Labem – 6 November 2018 in Prague) was a Czech art historian and curator. She served as the director of the Gallery of Modern Art in Roudnice nad Labem from 2008 to 2018.

References 

1953 births
2018 deaths
Czech women historians
Czech art historians
People from Roudnice nad Labem
20th-century Czech historians
21st-century Czech historians